Haramara Gaitán Fausto (born 7 August 1996) is a Mexican badminton player. She competed at the 2015 Toronto and 2019 Lima Pan American Games. Gaitan won a bronze medal at the 2018 Pan Am Championships in the women's singles event.

Achievements

Pan Am Championships 
Women's singles

Central American and Caribbean Games 
Women's singles

Women's doubles

BWF International Challenge/Series (7 titles, 8 runners-up) 
Women's singles

Women's doubles

  BWF International Challenge tournament
  BWF International Series tournament
  BWF Future Series tournament

References

External links

 
 

1996 births
Living people
Sportspeople from Guadalajara, Jalisco
Mexican female badminton players
Badminton players at the 2015 Pan American Games
Badminton players at the 2019 Pan American Games
Pan American Games competitors for Mexico
Central American and Caribbean Games gold medalists for Mexico
Central American and Caribbean Games silver medalists for Mexico
Central American and Caribbean Games bronze medalists for Mexico
Competitors at the 2010 Central American and Caribbean Games
Competitors at the 2014 Central American and Caribbean Games
Competitors at the 2018 Central American and Caribbean Games
Central American and Caribbean Games medalists in badminton
Badminton players at the 2020 Summer Olympics
Olympic badminton players of Mexico
21st-century Mexican women